The 2009 Cup of China was the third event of six in the 2009–10 ISU Grand Prix of Figure Skating, a senior-level international invitational competition series. It was held at the Capital Indoor Stadium in Beijing on October 29 – November 1. Medals were awarded in the disciplines of men's singles, ladies' singles, pair skating, and ice dancing. Skaters earned points toward qualifying for the 2009–10 Grand Prix Final. The compulsory dance was the Golden Waltz.

Schedule
All times are China standard time (UTC+8).

 Friday, October 30
 14:30 Ice dancing - compulsory dance
 15:55 Ladies - short program
 17:50 Men - short program
 19:45 Pairs - short program
 21:15 Ice dancing - original dance
 Saturday, October 31
 14:00 Ladies - free skating
 16:10 Men - free skating
 18:25 Ice dancing - free dance
 20:05 Pairs - free skating

Results

Men

Ladies

 WD = Withdrawn

Pairs

Ice dancing

External links

 
 
 

Cup Of China, 2009
Cup of China
Sports competitions in Beijing
2000s in Beijing
Cup
October 2009 sports events in China